The  International League season took place from April to September 2003.

The Durham Bulls defeated the Pawtucket Red Sox to win the league championship.

Attendance
Buffalo - 551,916
Charlotte - 268,374
Columbus - 480,445
Durham - 501,855
Indianapolis - 550,319
Louisville - 661,986
Norfolk - 480,963
Ottawa - 182,852
Pawtucket - 569,106
Richmond - 446,882
Rochester - 418,014
Scranton/W.B. - 427,445
Syracuse - 356,303
Toledo - 517,331

Playoffs

Division Series
North Division (Pawtucket)
IL Wild Card (Ottawa Lynx)

Winner: Pawtucket

South Division (Durham)
West Division  (Louisville)

Winner: Durham

Championship series
Pawtucket Red Sox

Durham Bulls

Winner: Durham Bulls; first team to win back to back IL titles since Columbus Clippers won back in 1991.

References

External links
International League official website

 
International League seasons